Neminidae is a family of flies belonging to the order Diptera.

Genera:
 Nemo McAlpine, 1983
 Nemula Freidberg, 1994
 Ningulus McAlpine, 1983

References

Opomyzoidea
Opomyzoidea genera